Touch football is an amateur variant of American football and Canadian football in which the basic rules are similar to those of the mainstream game (called "tackle football" for contrast), but instead of tackling players to the ground, the person carrying the ball need only be touched by a member of the opposite team to end a down. It is similar to street football, another amateur variant, however in street football full contact is allowed.

Rules
Depending on the skill of the players, the available playing field, and the purpose of the game, the rules other than the tackling aspect may remain mostly the same or vary considerably from traditional American or Canadian football.  Touch football can be played by teams as few as two or as many as twelve on each side; usually, games consist of teams of four to seven.

Positions in touch football are far less formal than its more organized counterpart. While some games roughly follow conventions, more often, all players will be considered eligible receivers (as in six-man football), and there are usually no running backs. There may or may not be a snapper; if there is not, the quarterback initiates play by hovering the ball above the line of scrimmage and pulling it backward to simulate a snap.

Generally, in touch football, nearly every play is a passing play, whereas run plays and pass plays tend to be well balanced in organized football.  Some games will also implement a "blitz count", or a period of time that must elapse after the snap before the defense may cross the line of scrimmage in order to attempt to tackle the quarterback.  The count thus gives the quarterback time to complete a pass in the absence of effective blocking (when teams are small, there is often no blocking at all).  Other games will not use a count and thus blocking becomes important. Conversely, in the presence of a "blitz count" there is also often a "QB sneak" rule, which prevents the quarterback from taking unfair advantage of the blitz count by preventing the quarterback from crossing the line of scrimmage before the blitz count is finished.

Because of these rules, passing plays are far more common than running plays in touch football.

Along with the size of the teams, the size of the field can vary considerably.  In a park, or spring practice situation, a full-sized field may be available, but many games are played in the front and back yards of suburban and rural village neighborhoods, where the whole field may not be much more than ten to thirty yards long.  In most of these situations, there are no yard lines, requiring some change in the definition of a first down.  Instead of requiring that a team advance the ball ten yards, sometimes two pass completions result in a first down.  Another option is to eliminate first downs entirely, so that a team gets four (sometimes five) chances to score; this process is most desirable on shorter fields.

When it is desired for an odd number of players to play, it is common to allow one player to be an "all-time Quarterback" player; this player will always be on the offense or the kicking team, switching sides throughout the game. This is often better known as a "Steady Quarterback" or "Steady Q". When this occurs, there is usually no blitz count and the all-time quarterback is usually never allowed to cross the line of scrimmage.

Another common variation is the elimination of the field goal and extra point kick; this is usually due to the absence of goal posts and tees on the field as well as due to poor kicking skill by the participants.  Some games eliminate kicking altogether, directing the teams to start each possession after a touchdown at the twenty-yard line, as if a kickoff and touch back had just occurred; other players prefer to change the kickoff into a "throw-off" or a "punt-off."

Scoring and game timing are much different in touch football than its more organized counterpart. For simplicity, touchdowns are usually worth 1 point and no other scoring is counted (there are no extra point attempts). In a much lesser used variation, a touchdown is worth 6 points and if the player who scored the touchdown can progress in the other direction from the end zone in which he had just scored back to the opposite end zone without being touched, it counts as a two-point conversion. The former scoring method does not allow for other scoring types such as safeties. There is usually no game clock and the game ends when one opponent has reached 10 touchdowns (in the former convention) or 100 points (in a standard convention).

Variable rules

Kickoff
Change of possession after scoring is often accompanied by rules determining where the ball is thrown from as opposed to actually kicking since throwing offers more control to players who may be playing in street-accessible areas and don't wish to chase a ball through traffic. When the kickoff style is open to variance after each score, the desired rules are called out and whichever is heard first, is the accepted rule. When the rules are agreed on before the start of a game and are made to be steady throughout, they are referred to as Auto-. The most accepted Auto- rules are Half Court, In Hands-- this offers a rule that gives advantages to both the kicking and receiving teams.

First touch
This rule controls the action of the offensive team's current quarterback, and requires that the blocking/countdown rule not be in use. When teams are even, a "shift" (hand-off) between two offensive players begins the play. It takes a touch from a defender assigned to the quarterback (the "first touch",) to stop his initial forward progress and determine where the ball will be thrown from. The assigned defender is stuck to the quarterback, unable to act as a pass defender or hinder. jus touch the man 

Depending on the group, first touch can refer to the quarterback's ability to run or walk after the shift. For example, one group may refer to first touch as the ability for the quarterback to run after the shift, get touched, and still throw the ball. Another group may use the rule to mean that the quarterback has the ability to walk or powerwalk forward, get touched, and throw. The first variation favors a game with many players, while the second may be best for games where there aren't many players.

Another addition to this rule is the "two-man touch," which penalizes the defense for being unaware of their assignments and teammates by making all players who touch the active quarterback stick to him, removing a defender from the field temporarily.

This rule is commonly and informally referred to "first taught," the result of players creating another past tense verb for "touch."

Hand Touch
As the name suggests, this rule determines the number of hands that must land on an offensive player simultaneously to stop the play/first touch situation. One-hand touch is often used with younger players, as two-hand touch demands greater dexterity. When used against more mature players, one-hand touch puts more pressure on the offense to juke and misdirect the defense. A variant called "rough touch" is also sometimes used, in which the defensive player must place both hands on the ball carrier with sufficient force to lightly shove him in order to stop the play.  This is somewhat subjective, but tends to reduce the frequency of disputed touches.

No/Half Court
In Half Court, the ball is kicked off at the halfway mark in the field. In No Half Court, the ball is expected to be thrown from the kicking team's goal line. Half Court is practical when playing on a long field, but it puts the kicking team closer and potentially limits the maneuverability of the receiving team. Half Court is preferred by kicking teams as it dramatically shortens the amount of space and time between the teams.

No/In Hands
In Hands means that the ball will be thrown to any specific person, usually at the kicker's discretion. No In Hands means that the ball will be thrown in the general area of the team, but without a target. In Hands saves the receiving team the trouble of chasing a bobbling ball, and is preferred.

First Down
Rules on first downs vary depending on the playing group and field size. In shorter fields, it may be impractical or unnecessary to create landmarks which would reset the downs, as four downs should be all the time needed to go from one end to the other. However, longer fields may need a halfway marker which, when reached, would reset the downs. Multiple markers can be used in this way depending on the field length. As stated above in the article, a number of completed passes may also result in a first down, if the teams desire it so. It is uncommon to see both length-based and pass-based rules in use simultaneously.

Extra Points
Some games count touchdowns as 1 point each. However, if traditional scoring is desired and no goal posts are available, teams have the option of using "automatic" extra points.  After a touchdown (6 points), teams can choose whether to automatically earn an extra point (for 7 total), or risk the extra point and attempt a 2-point conversion (for 8 total).

Field Goals
If traditional scoring is desired and no goal posts are available, teams can implement a "field goal zone" close to the endzone.  Anytime a team is within this zone, they may elect to automatically score 3 points and kickoff to the other team.  This gives teams a choice whether to risk going for the touchdown, or take the free points.

Safeties
If traditional scoring is used, teams score 2 points for a safety, and then receive the ball off of a free kick.  However, if simplified "1 point-per-touchdown" scoring is used, this creates a dilemma.  Solutions are to score 1/2 point or 1 full point for the safety and receive the ball off of a free kick; or have the safety result in a "turnover" to the opposite team, with the ball placed near the goal line. In the end this is just a safer version of regular football.

See also
 Flag football
 Street football (American)
 Touch football (rugby league)
 Touch rugby

References

External links

Variations of American football